A list of films produced in Egypt in 1981. For an A-Z list of films currently on Wikipedia, see :Category:Egyptian films.

External links
 Egyptian films of 1981 at the Internet Movie Database
 Egyptian films of 1981 elCinema.com

Lists of Egyptian films by year
1981 in Egypt
Lists of 1981 films by country or language